In the Line of Duty: Street War is an American action film which was released in 1992.  It is about a New York City Housing Authority policeman whose partner is killed and he seeks revenge for the killing.

Cast
Peter Boyle as Det. Dan Reilly 
Courtney B. Vance as Justice Butler
Morris Chestnut as Prince Franklin 
Mario Van Peebles as Raymond Williamson

External links 
 

1992 films
1992 television films
1990s action films
1990s crime films
American television films
Films scored by Mark Snow
American films about revenge
Films set in New York City
Films shot in Atlanta
Films shot in New York City
Hood films
American police detective films
Films directed by Dick Lowry
1992 drama films
1990s English-language films
1990s American films